"Please Don't Go" is a popular song written by Les Reed and Jackie Rae, and recorded by the Welsh singer Donald Peers. The melody of the song was adapted from a classical piece, "Barcarolle" from the opera The Tales of Hoffmann by Offenbach.  

It was the first top 10 UK Singles Chart (compiled since 1952) entry for Peers, an old-style singer popular in the 1940s. It entered the UK Singles Chart on 24 December 1968, reaching number three on 11 March 1969. 

Eddy Arnold had a 1969 top-ten hit with the song in the United States.

Charts

References

1968 songs
1968 singles
Songs written by Jackie Rae